Pelageya Sergeyevna Telegina (before marriage Pelageya Sergeyevna Khanova; born Polina Sergeyevna Smirnova; 14 July 1986), known mononymously as Pelageya, is а Russian singer. She sings folk-songs from different nations in different languages, romances and compositions written by the members of her group, mostly in rock arrangements.

Life and career
Pelageya's mother, Svetlana Gennadiyevna Khanova, formerly a jazz-singer, theatre director and performing arts instructor, is now a producer and art director of her daughter's band. Pelageya's father is unknown. Her last name Khanova is the surname of her mother's last husband. At the age of eight, Pelageya entered the musical school attached to Novosibirsk Conservatoire. At nine she was awarded the title "Best folk-singer of Russia in 1996" at a television contest.

In 1997, she sang at Moscow's 850th Anniversary Pageant concert, was the sole performer at the Heads of Government of Three States Summit (Jacques Chirac, Helmut Kohl, Boris Yeltsin) and participated in KVN TV show as a member of Novosibirsk State University team.

In July 1999, she was invited by Mstislav Rostropovich to a musical festival in France alongside Evgeny Kissin, Ravi Shankar, B.B. King. In an interview to a French newspaper Galina Vishnevskaya – Rostropovich's wife –  called her then "a future of the world's opera". In 2000 Pelageya assembled a band under her name.

In 2009, Pelageya was awarded the title "Best female soloist of the year" according to Nashe Radio.

In 2015 she was awarded "Best Folk Artist" at the Russian National Music Awards.

After the birth of her daughter, she returned to music by taking part in the anniversary concert of Nikolay Rastorguyev, the leader of the band Lyube, where she performed the song "Конь" ("Horse") in a duet with him.

Personal life 
In 2010, Pelageya married Dmitry Efimovich, a television director. They divorced two years later. In 2016 she married Russian hockey player Ivan Telegin. They have a daughter Taisiya . In December 2019, Pelageya announced on Instagram her separation from Telegin.

Discography 
 2003 — Pelageya (Пелагея)
 2007 — Maid's songs (Девушкины песни)
 2009 — Siberian drive (Сибирский драйв)
 2010 — Paths (Тропы)

Band members 

 Pelageya – vocals
 Pavel Deshura – guitar, back vocals, arrangement – died on 15 July 2022, aged 36.
 Konstantin Polyakov, since 08.14.22 – guitar
 Svetlana Khanova – producer, lyrics, arrangement, audio mixing
 Daniil Oplachkin – drums
 Alexander (Sanya) Savinykh – bass guitar, back vocals
 Anton Tsypkin — bayan (accordion), keyboards
 Sergey Poluboyarinov – sound director

References

External links 
 Official site
 
 

1986 births
Living people
Russian folk-pop singers
Russian folk musicians
21st-century Russian singers
Russian child singers
20th-century Russian women singers
20th-century Russian singers
21st-century Russian women singers
Russian National Music Award winners
Honored Artists of the Russian Federation